Brough (locally ) is a town in the East Riding of Yorkshire, England. It is part of the civil parish of Elloughton-cum-Brough with the neighbouring village of Elloughton. Brough has a long association with BAE Systems.

History
The town was known as Petuaria during the Roman period, and served as the capital of the Celtic tribe of the Parisi. Petuaria marked the southern end of the Roman road known now as Cade's Road which ran roughly northwards for a hundred miles to Pons Aelius (modern day Newcastle upon Tyne).

The town's name is simply from the Old English burh meaning "fortification" and is thus related to the terms borough and burgh.

Brough was created a town by the Archbishop of York in 1239, granted the same liberties as Beverley. There is no record of these liberties having been employed, and the settlement operated as a village for further centuries.

The town is significant for its association with the highwayman Dick Turpin. About June 1737 Turpin boarded at the Ferry Inn at Brough, under the alias of John Palmer (or Parmen). Turpin travelled between and resided in Brough, until his capture and execution for horse theft in 1739.

Demographics

Over the past couple of years, there has been a shift in the socio-economic group of people living in Brough because of improved rail links and new housing developments, most recently the Brough South development. This change has brought more money into the area. As a result, the average wage rate and amount of spending has increased significantly.

Amenities
Brough has a range of shops and takeaways, and two supermarkets: Morrisons, Aldi, Sainsbury's Local, with a Lidl planned to be built. There are two dentists, two vets, hairdressers, a medical centre, a private hearing aid audiologist, a post office.  Brough also has a couple of public houses.

Education
Primary education at Brough is provided by Brough Primary School and newly moved, Hunsley Primary, previously near the secondary school in Melton.

Transport

The town is served by Brough railway station on the Hull to Selby and Doncaster railway line. Direct rail services to London are provided by Hull Trains and London North Eastern Railway. Other services are TransPennine Express trains running west to Leeds, Manchester Piccadilly, Liverpool, and Northern to York, Doncaster and Sheffield. All east-bound trains run to Hull: some then run north to Cottingham, Beverley, Driffield, Bridlington, Filey and Scarborough.

Most local bus services are provided by East Yorkshire Motor Services. The services run to Hull as well as other towns and villages in the East Riding such as Goole, Howden, North Ferriby and Beverley. There are daily Stagecoach in Hull services to Leeds. National Express also stop at Brough.

BAE Systems

BAE Systems (formerly British Aerospace), Brough, manufactured the Hawk Advanced Jet Trainer aircraft at Brough Aerodrome. BAE provided apprenticeships to local school leavers. The runway at the site was re-opened for a while for occasional use solely by Hawk aircraft taking off after manufacture to transfer by air to Warton near Preston in Lancashire for final flight testing and painting though the former Air Traffic Control building has now been transformed into the Brough Business Centre.

On 3 April 2008 BAE Systems announced it would be losing 450 jobs from the Brough site. On 1 March 2012 BAE Systems announced it would be ending manufacturing at its site in Brough with 845 employees to be made redundant. Manufacturing at the plant ceased on Christmas Eve 2020.
There are now proposals to build over much of the airfield - including the runway. As of 2020, construction on the runway has started with phase two of the Brough South development (Brough Relief Road).

Notable people
Robert Stephenson (1906–1942), first-class cricketer and Royal Navy officer

References

External links

Excavations on a Roman Extra-Mural Site at Brough-on-Humber, East Riding of Yorkshire, UK in Internet Archaeology 

Towns in the East Riding of Yorkshire